Men's 100m races for blind & visually impaired athletes at the 2004 Summer Paralympics were held in the Athens Olympic Stadium from 25 to 27 September. Events were held in two disability classes.

T12

The T12 event consisted of 2 heats and a final. It was won by Ignacio Avila, representing .

1st Round

Heat 1
25 Sept. 2004, 09:30

Heat 2
25 Sept. 2004, 09:38

Final Round
27 Sept. 2004, 18:45

T13

The T13 event consisted of a single race. It was won by Tim Prendergast, representing .

Final Round
27 Sept. 2004, 18:35

References

M